Romance on Lushan Mountain is a 1980 colour film produced in China.  It was in its entirety shot at Lushan Mountain in Jiujiang, China and was directed by Huang Zumo. It is alternatively known as A Love Story at Lushan Mountain and Love on Lushan Mountain.

It holds the Guinness World Record for "the longest first run of a film in one cinema" for having been shown continuously since 1980.

Plot
In the 1970s, after the establishment of diplomat relation between the People's Republic of China and the United States, Zhou Jun, the daughter of a retired Kuomintang general, Zhou Zhenwu, who now lives in America, visits mainland China for sightseeing. In Mount Lu, she meets Geng Hua, a young man who is preparing his college entrance exams, and they fall in love. Geng's father, a CPC officer, is now under political investigation by Gang of Four. The junior Geng is accompanying his unwell mother to the mountain for rehabilitation. Due to his frequent contacts with Zhou, Geng is summoned for interrogation. Zhou returns to the States with regrets.

After the fall of Gang of Four, Zhou, still keeping her feelings for Geng in her heart, visited Lu Mountain again. While Geng, now a postgraduate student of Tsinghua University, happens to come to Mount Lu for academic colloquium. Fortunately, these two reunite and decide to marry each other. Geng Hua asks his father, Geng Feng, for his agreement, and shows him the photo of Miss Zhou's family. The senior Geng recognizes that the girl's father, Zhou Zhenwu, was his classmate back in Whampoa Military Academy. Because they followed different political parties, they became the rivals in the battlefield during Chinese Civil War. Thus, he immediately rejects this marriage. After some difficulties, the two seniors, both with the intention of reunification of China, meet on Mount Lu. The hostility is thawed, and they become relatives by marriage when the junior Zhou and Geng finally get together.

World record

According to Guinness World Records, this film has the Longest First-Run of a Film in One Cinema (Love Story in Lushan Cinema). It premiered at the Jiangxi Movie Circulation and Screening Company in Lushan, China, on July 12, 1980, and has been shown daily up to now. Watching the film at the said cinema has become a tourist attraction.

References

External links
Love on Lushan Mountain at the Chinese Movie Database
Romance on Lushan Mountain at the BFI Film & TV Database

1980 films
Chinese romantic drama films
1980s romance films
Films set in Jiangxi
Films about the Cultural Revolution
Films directed by Huang Zumo